NUH may refer to:

National University Hospital, Singapore
National Union of the Homeless
Newham University Hospital, an acute general hospital in Plaistow, London
Nottingham University Hospitals NHS Trust

See also
 Nuh (disambiguation)